PT Bank Maybank Indonesia Tbk, formerly known as Bank Internasional Indonesia (BII) is one of private banks in Indonesia which also is a part of Maybank, one of the largest financial services groups in ASEAN. Previously, Maybank Indonesia was known as PT Bank Internasional Indonesia Tbk (BII) which was founded on 15 May 1959. BII would then obtain its license as a foreign exchange bank in 1988. The company would then become publicly listed in the Jakarta Stock Exchange and Surabaya Stock Exchange (now merged as the Indonesia Stock Exchange) in 1989.

Maybank Indonesia provides a comprehensive range of products and services for individual and corporate customers through Community Financial Services (Retail Banking and Non-Retail Banking) and Global Banking, as well as automotive financing through its subsidiaries, WOM Finance for two wheelers and Maybank Finance for four wheelers. Maybank Indonesia also continues to develop digital banking services and capacity through Mobile Banking, Internet Banking, Maybank2U (internet-based mobile banking) and various other channels.

As of 31 December 2019, Maybank Indonesia maintains 374 branches including Sharia branches spread across Indonesia and one overseas branch (Mumbai, India), 21 Mobile Cash Vehicles and 1,571 ATMs including CDM (Cash Deposit Machines) connected with over 20,000 ATMs in ATM PRIMA, ATM BERSAMA, ALTO, CIRRUS and connected to 3,500 Maybank ATMs in Singapore, Malaysia and Brunei. By end of 2019, Maybank Indonesia managed Rp110.6 trillion in customer deposits and Rp169.1 trillion in assets.

References

External links 
 Coorporate Site

1959 establishments in Indonesia
1980s initial public offerings
Banks of Indonesia
Banks established in 1959
Companies based in Jakarta
Companies listed on the Indonesia Stock Exchange
Maybank